Subharmonic was an independent record label based in New York City. It primarily issued music with strong ambient and dub music influence. Its sub-label was Strata Records, which issued all its albums in an opaque black container. The label was founded in 1993 by music producers Bill Laswell, John Matarazzo and Robert Soares. A falling out with Matarazzo occurred during the mid-nineties, effectively ending the label's activities.

List of releases

Main discography

Strata discography

References

External links

American independent record labels
Experimental music record labels
Ambient music record labels
Record labels established in 1993
Companies based in New York City